Mr. Messiah is the alias of Yuri Kostrov, an electronic musician and DJ, who was born October 27, 1988 in Russia. He is an important figure in the St. Petersburg dubstep and breakcore scenes and he is also closely affiliated with Russia's glitch, IDM, and hardcore techno music scenes.

In 2008 he released his debut record entitled The Dublab on Seattle's Automation Records. The record was featured in such publications as Dusted Magazine, Experimusic, Textura, Cylic Defrost, and DJ mag. Tracks from the record were also featured on the mix CD Frequency Labyrinths by Neut and DJ Marcelle Van Hoof’s Another Nice Mess.

External links
Myspace page
Mr. Messiah on Discogs
 Mr. Messiah on Last.fm

Notes and references

Russian electronic musicians
1988 births
Living people
Musicians from Saint Petersburg